Barbatula sturanyi is a species of ray-finned fish in the genus Barbatula.

Footnotes

External links
 http://www.fishbase.org/Summary/SpeciesSummary.php?id=65107

sturanyi
Fish described in 1892